"No Me Doy por Vencido" (English: I Don't Give Up) is a Spanish language song performed by Puerto Rican-American singer-songwriter Luis Fonsi. It was released on June 9, 2008, for the promotional and charity compilation, AT&T Team USA Soundtrack (2008) and lead single from seventh studio album Palabras del Silencio (2008). The music video of the song was released on YouTube in August 2008. It is one of the singer's biggest hit to date, breaking into the Billboard Hot 100.

Chart performance
After making its debut during the summer of 2008, the song became a number one hit on the Hot Latin Tracks chart in September. As of 17 January 2009, the song was at the top for 17 of the latest 19 weeks (only to be interrupted for two weeks in November by Enrique Iglesias' "Lloro Por Ti"). It would not only hold off "Lloro Por Ti" from the top spot, but it would hold off other hits such as "Te Regalo Amores" by R.K.M & Ken-Y, "Dame Tu Amor" by Alacranes Musical, and "Como Duele" by Ricardo Arjona. It was a big success in Spain where it peaked at number four and sold 50,000 copies. "No Me Doy por Vencido" was named the fourth best-performing Latin pop song of the decade ending 31 December 2009.

Track listing

CD single
 "No Me Doy por Vencido" 
 "No Me Doy por Vencido" 
 "No Me Doy por Vencido" (featuring MJ) 
 "No Me Doy por Vencido" (featuring MJ)

Remixes
 "No Me Doy por Vencido" 
 "No Me Doy por Vencido" (featuring German Montero)

Charts

Weekly charts

All-time charts

Certifications

2009 Latin Billboard Music Awards

See also
List of number-one songs of 2008 (Mexico)

References

2008 singles
2008 songs
Spanish-language songs
Luis Fonsi songs
Monitor Latino Top General number-one singles
Record Report Top 100 number-one singles
Record Report Top Latino number-one singles
Bachata songs
Songs written by Claudia Brant
Songs written by Luis Fonsi
2000s ballads
Pop ballads